ZFC-FM is a Variety hits station serving Freeport and Grand Bahama in The Bahamas.  It is unknown if the station is currently operating.

External links 
 Cool 96 FM Official Website (Web Archive)

Radio stations in the Bahamas
Classic hits radio stations
Radio stations established in 2004